Mithu Mukherjee may refer to:
 Mithu Mukherjee (cricketer)
 Mithu Mukherjee (actress)